The plumed guineafowl (Guttera plumifera) is a member of the guineafowl bird family. It is found in humid primary forest in Central Africa. It resembles some subspecies of the crested guineafowl, but has a straighter (not curled) and higher crest, and a relatively long wattle on either side of the bill. The bare skin on the face and neck is entirely dull grey-blue in the western nominate subspecies, while there are a few orange patches among the grey-blue in the eastern subspecies schubotzi.

Taxonomy

There are two recognized subspecies:
 G. p. plumifera (Cassin, 1857)  - Cameroon plumed guineafowl - southern Cameroon to Congo Basin, northern Gabon, and northern Angola 
 G. p. schubotzi (Reichenow, 1912) - Schubotz's plumed guineafowl - northern Zaire to East African Rift and forests west of Lake Tanganyika

References

plumed guineafowl
Birds of Central Africa
plumed guineafowl